Williams Černeka (born 19 September 1959 in Rijeka) is a former Croatian handball player. Since 2002 he has been the tehniko of RK Zamet

He is the father of Dario Černeka.

Honours
Zamet
Yugoslav Second League (1): 1977-78
Yugoslav Third League (1): 1976-77

Sources
Petar Orgulić - 50 godina rukometa u Rijeci (2005), Adria public

References

Croatian male handball players
RK Zamet players
RK Zamet coaches
Yugoslav male handball players
Handball players from Rijeka
1959 births
Living people